Below is a list of notable footballers who have played for ES Sétif. Generally, this means players that have played 100 or more league matches for the club. However, some players who have played fewer matches are also included; this includes players that have had considerable success either at other clubs or at international level, as well as players who are well remembered by the supporters for particular reasons.

Players are listed in alphabetical order according to the date of their first-team official debut for the club. Appearances and goals are for first-team competitive matches only. Substitute appearances included. Statistics accurate as of 26 May 2019.

List of ES Sétif players

Nationalities are indicated by the corresponding FIFA country code.

List of All-time appearances
This List of All-time appearances for ES Sétif contains football players who have played for ES Sétif and have managed to accrue 100 or more appearances.

Bold Still playing competitive football in ES Sétif.

1 Includes the Super Cup and League Cup.
2 Includes the Cup Winners' Cup, Confederation Cup, Champions League, CAF Super Cup and FIFA Club World Cup.
3 Includes the Champions League and UAFA Club Cup.

Players from ES Sétif to Europe

Award winners
(Whilst playing for ES Sétif)

Top goalscorers in Algerian Ligue 1
  Mohamed Griche (21 goals) – 1975–76
  Isâad Bourahli (16 goals) – 2000–01

Algerian professional football awards Player of the Year 
  Mourad Delhoum – 2012–13
  Toufik Zerara – 2014–15

Algerian professional football awards Goalkeeper of the Year
  Sofiane Khedairia – 2014–15

Algerian professional football awards Manager of the Year
  Azzedine Aït Djoudi – 2008–09
  Hubert Velud – 2012–13
  Kheïreddine Madoui – 2014–15

Notes

References

External links 

Players
 
ES Sétif
ES Sétif
Association football player non-biographical articles